The men's individual sabre competition at the 2018 Asian Games in Jakarta was held on 20 August at the Jakarta Convention Center.

Schedule
All times are Western Indonesia Time (UTC+07:00)

Results

Preliminaries

Pool A

Pool B

Pool C

Pool D

Summary

Knockout round

Final

Top half

Bottom half

Final standing

References

Results

External links
 Fencing at the 2018 Asian Games - Men's Sabre Individual

Men's Sabre Individual